Distel Zola (born 5 February 1989) is a professional footballer who plays as a defensive midfielder for USL Championship club Charlotte Independence, on loan from El Paso Locomotive. Born in France, he represents Congo DR internationally.

He is a former French youth international having earned caps at all levels of youth. In 2010, Zola switched international allegiance to the Democratic Republic of the Congo due to his ancestry. He made his debut in May 2010 in a friendly match against Saudi Arabia.

Career

Early career
Born in Paris, Zola began his football career at the age of five at a local football academy in his hometown of Champigny-sur-Marne, a local southeastern Parisian suburb. After spending eight years at the club, he moved to US Alfortville. After a two-year stint in Alfortville, Zola drew interest from professional clubs Paris Saint-Germain, Auxerre, and Monaco. Zola ultimately signed with Monaco describing the club as the "most convincing" of the three.

Monaco
Zola spent one season in Monaco's youth academy, and, in the 2005–06 season, appeared in two matches on the club's Championnat de France amateur team in the fourth division. The following season, he was promoted to the amateur team full-time making 15 appearances. Zola spent two more seasons playing on the amateur team and, prior to the start of the 2008–09 season, turned professional and was, subsequently, promoted to the senior team and assigned the number 29 shirt by manager Ricardo Gomes.

Zola appeared on the bench for the club's first five league matches and continued to play on the club's amateur team in the fifth division. On 25 September 2008, while playing with the amateur team, he suffered a torn anterior cruciate ligament in his right knee, which required five months of rehabilitation. He returned to play in February 2009, but did not make any senior team appearances. Zola later suffered an injury setback to his knee and endured significant rehabilitation for much of the 2009–10 season. On 10 August 2010, a healthy Zola was loaned out to Ligue 2 club Stade Lavallois for the entire 2010–11 season in order for the player to get some first-team playing time. On 13 August, Zola made his professional debut in a league match against Metz. He appeared as a substitute in a 1–0 victory.

Nancy
In July 2011, Nancy confirmed that it had signed Zola to a three-year contract. Zola ended his career at Monaco without making a senior team appearance for the club.

Le Havre and Châteauroux
After a single game for Nancy in six months, Zola was loaned to Le Havre AC, a stay that was made permanent in the summer of 2012. In August 2014, Zola joined Châteauroux on a three-year contract.

Samsunspor
On 15 July 2015, Zola joined Süper Lig side Samsunspor.

El Paso Locomotive
On 12 December 2019, after spending the 2018–2019 season with French third tier side Tours FC, Zola joined USL Championship side El Paso Locomotive ahead of the 2020 season.

Charlotte Independence (loan)
On 27 April 2021, Zola joined Charlotte Independence on loan for the 2021 season.

International career
After representing the French youth teams, Zola chose to play for the DR Congo in 2010.

References

External links
 Distel Zola club profile
 
 

Living people
1989 births
Footballers from Paris
Association football midfielders
French footballers
Democratic Republic of the Congo footballers
Democratic Republic of the Congo international footballers
French sportspeople of Democratic Republic of the Congo descent
AS Monaco FC players
Stade Lavallois players
AS Nancy Lorraine players
Le Havre AC players
LB Châteauroux players
Samsunspor footballers
Tours FC players
El Paso Locomotive FC players
Charlotte Independence players
Ligue 2 players
Ligue 1 players
Championnat National players
Süper Lig players
France youth international footballers
French expatriate sportspeople in Monaco
Expatriate footballers in Monaco
Expatriate soccer players in the United States
Democratic Republic of the Congo expatriate footballers
Democratic Republic of the Congo expatriate sportspeople in the United States
USL Championship players
Black French sportspeople